Owli (also Romanized as Owlī; also known as Ūlīq) is a village in Dizmar-e Sharqi Rural District, Minjavan District, Khoda Afarin County, East Azerbaijan Province, Iran. At the 2006 census, its population was 300, in 70 families.

References 

Populated places in Khoda Afarin County